Lijevo Trebarjevo  is a village in Croatia.

Lijevo Trebarjevo has an altitude of 93m and is  near to Sisak.

References

Populated places in Sisak-Moslavina County